Ariana is a feminine given name, popular in many languages. Arianna and Ariane are the two most common variations.

Etymology
The name Ariana may be used following several possible following origins.

The name Arianna is the Latinized form of the Ancient greek name Ariadne ("most holy", Cretan Greek αρι [ari] "most" and αδνος [adnos] "holy"), the daughter of Minos, King of Crete, and his queen Pasiphaë, daughter of Helios, the Sun-titan, from Greek mythology.

Ariana, a term in classical history, from Latin Arianus, Ariana, from Greek Arianē, Areianē, names applied in classical times to the eastern part of ancient Iran and to its inhabitants. Ancient Iranians used the name in reference to themselves (Old Persian ariya-), hence Iran. Ultimately from Sanskrit arya- "compatriot;" in later language "noble, of good family.", was a general geographical term used by some Greek and Roman authors of antiquity for an extensive territory in Central Asia, comprising the eastern part of the Persian empire, now all of Afghanistan and a part of Iran and southeast of Tajikistan. The name of Iran (Persia) originates from the Old Persian word airiyanem (Ariana) meaning "[The Land of] the Aryans".

Ariana is sometimes used as a Welsh name, an elaboration of Welsh: arian “silver.”

Name days
Greece: 18 September.
Latvia: 22 February.
Poland: 17 September.
Russia: 1 October.

Popularity
In the United States, the name Ariana peaked at 30th most popular name for baby girls in 2014, and was in the top 40th to 100th most popular names during the first and second decades of the 21st century. Arianna also peaked in 2014, at 40th place, and was in the top 50 to low 100s range in the same period. The names are 68th and 95th place for 2017.

Notable people

Ariana
Ariana Barouk (born 1982), Cuban model
Ariana Berlin (born 1987), American gymnast and actor
Ariana Chris (born 1975), Canadian opera singer
Ariana DeBose (born 1991), American actress, singer and dancer
Ariana Gillis (born 1990), Canadian singer-songwriter
Ariana Grande (born 1993), American singer and actress
Ariana Guido (born 1999), American actress
Ariana Jollee (born 1982), American pornographic actress
Ariana Kelly (born 1976), American politician 
Ariana Kukors (born 1989), American swimmer
Ariana Austin Makonnen (born 1984), American philanthropist
Ariana Miyamoto (born 1994), Japanese model
Ariana Nozeman (1626–1661), Dutch actress
Ariana Reines (born 1982), American poet and activist
Ariana Richards (born 1979), American actress and painter
Ariana Rockefeller (born 1982), American fashion designer
Ariana Rodriguez (born 1990), Puerto Rican model
Ariana Savalas (born 1987), American musician

Arianna
Arianna Afsar (born 1991), American beauty pageant contestant and semi-finalist on American Idol
Arianna Bergamaschi (born 1975), Italian singer, stage actress and television presenter 
Arianna Errigo (born 1988), Italian foil fencer
Arianna Follis (born 1977), Italian cross country skier
Arianna Fontana (born 1990), Italian short track speed skater
Arianna Huffington (born 1950), a co-founder of Huffington Post
Arianna Savall (born 1972), Swiss-born Spanish classical singer, harpist, and composer
Arianna Vanderpool-Wallace (born 1990), a swimmer from the Bahamas
Arianna Zukerman (born 1972), American lyric soprano

Ariane
 Princess Ariane of the Netherlands (born 2007)
 Ariane Andrew (born 1987), American professional wrestler and manager
 Ariane Ascaride (born 1954), French actress and screenwriter
 Louise Bourgoin (born 1981), birth name Ariane Bourgoin, French actress
 Ariane Ehrat (born 1961), Swiss former alpine skier
 Ariane Forster (1962-2010), German singer best known by stage name Ari Up
 Ariane Friedrich (born 1984), German high jumper
 Ariane Hingst (born 1979), German retired football player
 Ariane Koizumi (born 1963), model and actress
 Ariane Labed (born 1984), French actress
 Ariane Laroux (born 1957), Franco-Swiss painter, draughtsman and printmaker
 Ariane Mnouchkine (born 1939), French stage director
 Ariane Moffatt (born 1979), Québécois singer-songwriter
 Ariane Schluter (born 1966), Dutch actress
 Ariane Sherine (born 1980), British comedy writer and journalist

Ariarne
 Ariarne Titmus (born 2000), Australian swimmer

Aryana
Aryana Harvey (born 1997), American soccer player
Aryana Sayeed (born 1985), Afghan singer
Aryana Engineer (born 2001),  Canadian actress

Fictional characters
Ariana Dumbledore, fictional character in J.K. Rowling's Harry Potter series
Arianna Hernandez, a character in the Days of our Lives television series
Arianna Horton, a character named after Arianna Hernandez on Days of our Lives
 Arianna "Ari" Langley, the main protagonist of Mary Stanton's Unicorns of Balinor book series.
 Ariane, the lead female character in Ariane et Barbe-bleue, an opera by Paul Dukas
 Ariane, the lead female character in Love in the Afternoon (1957 film)
 Arianne Martell, fictional character in G.R.R. Martin's The song of Ice and Fire series
Queen Arianna, supporting character of Tangled: The Series in which she is the birth mother of Rapunzel

See also
Ariana (disambiguation)
Arianna (disambiguation)
Ariadne (disambiguation)

References

External links
 Google Trends: Ariana, Arianna
 Social Security Administration: Popular Baby Names

English feminine given names
Persian feminine given names
Persian words and phrases
Ariadne
Given names of Greek language origin
pl:Ariadna